John Tunks was the member of Parliament for Cricklade in the parliament of April 1554.

References

External links 

Members of Parliament for Cricklade
English MPs 1554
Year of birth unknown
Year of death unknown